Audacious may refer to:

 Audacious (album), a 2016 album by Cupcakke
 Audacious (software), an open-source media player

Ships 
 List of ships named Audacious
 HMS Audacious, various ships of the British Royal Navy
 Audacious-class aircraft carrier of the British Royal Navy
 Audacious-class ironclad, Victorian-era battleship class of the British Royal Navy
 SS Audacious (1913), a cargo ship used by the United States during World War II
 USNS Audacious (T-AGOS-11), a Stalwart-class Modified Tactical Auxiliary General Ocean Surveillance Ship of the United States Navy

See also
Audacity (disambiguation)
Audacieux